The 2018–19 Canberra United FC season was the club's eleventh season in the W-League, the premier competition for women's football. The team played home games at McKellar Park and Seiffert Oval. The club's manager for the season was Heather Garriock.

Players

Squad information

(captain)

Transfers in

Transfers out

Pre-season and friendlies

W-League

League table

Fixtures

Results summary

Results by round

References

External links
 Official Website

Canberra United FC seasons